DYJV (106.1 FM), broadcasting as 106.1 FM2, is a radio station owned and operated by Capricom Production and Management through its subsidiary One Media Boracay Inc. Its studios and main office are located at Zone 5, Boracay Bulabog Rd., Malay, Aklan.

History
Radio Boracay began broadcasting around in 2006 with a mix of Top 40 and island music.

In March 2009, the station underwent changes with the arrival of longtime broadcaster and former Malay municipal councilor Jonathan Cabrera. Under Cabrera's management, Radio Boracay added news and talk programming to the lineup.

From 2010 to 2013, Radio Boracay was an affiliate of Magic 89.9, airing Good Times and Boys Night Out. In 2014, it started airing a local morning program Radyo Birada.

In 2017, Radio Boracay became an affiliate of the government-owned Philippine Broadcasting Service and rebranded as 106.1 FM2 with a classic hits format.

References

External links

Radio stations in Boracay
Radio stations established in 2006